Martin Benedict Volpeliere-Pierrot (born 19 May 1965) is an English singer best known as the vocalist from the band Curiosity Killed the Cat and later an offshoot group 'Curiosity'. He is known for sporting a distinctive hat often mistaken for a beret, which is actually a fiddler cap – a traditional Greek fisherman's hat – worn backwards.

Early life 
Volpeliere-Pierrot is the son of 1960s celebrity photographer Jean Claude Volpeliere-Pierrot and the model Belinda Watson. He attended Woolverstone Hall School in Ipswich, which he credited in a 1987 interview with giving him "real hope" through the education he received. In the mid 1980s, he appeared as a model on the front of Mike Read's Pop Quiz board game (made by Waddingtons in 1985) and formed the band Curiosity Killed the Cat.

Curiosity Killed the Cat 
Curiosity Killed the Cat was formed in 1984 and had several hit singles in the UK. At the time of their breakthrough, Volpeliere-Pierrot was known for wearing a beret in most pictures of the band, though it was actually a peaked fisherman's hat, turned round with the peak to the rear so that it resembled a beret. Ben VP (as he was billed on a number of solo singles in the mid-1990s) was frequently referred to as 'Ben Vol-au-vent Parrot' in Smash Hits magazine, with 'Bendy Ben' (or 'Boozy Ben') also used.

Their 1989 hit "Name and Number" has been sampled and remixed several times, including a version credited to Elements vs Ben VP in 2006.

Post-Curiosity 
The band, who had signed to RCA Records/BMG as Curiosity in the early 1990s, split in 1994, with Ben VP signing to Telstar Records to release the 1996 single "Gotta Get You Home".

In 2018, Volpeliere-Pierrot appeared on Channel 4's First Dates. The programme paired him with a glamorous date ten years younger, but there was no attraction, instead the date called her mother and suggested that she go on a date with the singer.

References 

English male singers
1965 births
Living people
Singers from London
Sophisti-pop musicians